The 2009 NCAA Division I Football Championship Game was a postseason college football game between the Villanova Wildcats and the Montana Grizzlies. It was played on December 18, 2009, at Finley Stadium, home field of the University of Tennessee at Chattanooga. The culminating game of the 2009 NCAA Division I FCS football season, it was won by Villanova, 23–21.

Teams
The participants of the Championship Game were the finalists of the 2009 FCS Playoffs, which began with a 16-team bracket.

Montana Grizzlies

Montana finished their regular season with an 11–0 record (8–0 in conference). As the first-seed in the tournament, the Grizzlies defeated South Dakota State, Stephen F. Austin, and Appalachian State to reach the final. This was Montana's second consecutive and seventh overall appearance in an FCS/Division I-AA championship game, having previously won in 1995 and 2001, and having lost in 1996, 2000, 2004, and 2008.

Villanova Wildcats

Villanova finished their regular season with a 10–1 record (7–1 in conference). As the second-seed in the tournament, the Wildcats defeated Holy Cross, New Hampshire (who had given Villanova their only loss during the regular season), and William & Mary to reach the final. This was Villanova's first appearance in an FCS/Division I-AA championship game.

Game summary

Scoring summary

Game statistics

References

Further reading

External links
 Box score at ESPN
 12/18/2009 Villanova vs Montana Football Highlights via YouTube

Championship Game
NCAA Division I Football Championship Games
Montana Grizzlies football games
Villanova Wildcats football games
College football in Tennessee
American football competitions in Chattanooga, Tennessee
NCAA Division I Football Championship Game
NCAA Division I Football Championship Game